Shkëlzen Kelmendi (born 14 January 1985) is an Albanian football player who most recently played for Turbina in the Albanian First Division.

External links
 
 Profile - FSHF

1985 births
Living people
Footballers from Shkodër
Albanian footballers
Association football midfielders
Albania youth international footballers
KF Erzeni players
KF Vllaznia Shkodër players
KF Skrapari players
KF Apolonia Fier players
KF Bylis Ballsh players
KS Sopoti Librazhd players
KS Kastrioti players
KS Turbina Cërrik players
Kategoria Superiore players
Kategoria e Parë players